John Mike Dooley is a hurler from County Kerry. He has played with the Kerry senior team and the Irish Hurling/Shinty Compromise International Rules team. He has also played with his local club, Causeway. He won a league medal with Kerry in 2001 score in a 4-14 to 3-10 win over Westmeath. He made three of his sides' four goals. He won 3 County Senior Championship medals with Causeway in 1998, 2019 and 2022. In 2005, he won Kerry's first Christy Ring Cup All Star.

References 
https://web.archive.org/web/20110622102227/http://archives.tcm.ie/thekingdom/2005/03/31/story16732.asp
https://web.archive.org/web/20110622102247/http://archives.tcm.ie/thekingdom/2005/07/07/story17786.asp
http://www.sportsfile.com/id/291053/
http://www.sportsfile.com/id/RP0022812/
http://www.sportsfile.com/id/153807/

Causeway hurlers
Kerry inter-county hurlers
Living people
Year of birth missing (living people)